Gbokopeteme is a village in the Lobaye region in the Central African Republic approximately  southwest of the capital, Bangui.

Nearby towns and villages include Zende (4.9 nm), Mbousi (7.3 nm), Dimbanga (7.4 nm), Ndimango (4.1 nm), Tongolo (5.3 nm), Peketo (5.3 nm), Bobangui (9.2 nm), Bogombe (9.0 nm) and Boyama (7.7 nm).

Populated places in Lobaye